Typhrasa is a genus of fungi in the family Psathyrellaceae. It contains four species:
 Typhrasa gossypina 
 Typhrasa nanispora 
 Typhrasa polycystis 
 Typhrasa rugocephala

References

Psathyrellaceae
Agaricales genera